Kathleen Reed (formerly Kathleen Walcher) is a former member of the Ohio House of Representatives. She served from 2003 to 2006.

Career 
Walcher held multiple positions in county government, including ten years as the Huron County Common Pleas Court clerk, time as Huron County's deputy clerk and the sheriff's civil deputy.

Walcher was elected to represent the 58th district in the Ohio House of Representatives in 2002 after beating Ken Bailey with approximately 58 percent of the vote.

Walcher Reed resigned her seat in 2006 during her second term. Dan White was appointed to replace her.

Personal life 

In 2005, Kathleen changed her last name from Walcher to Reed due to dissolution of marriage.

References

External links
Profile on the Ohio Ladies' Gallery website

Republican Party members of the Ohio House of Representatives
Living people
Women state legislators in Ohio
Year of birth missing (living people)
21st-century American politicians
21st-century American women politicians